Hamara Dil Aapke Paas Hai (My Heart is with You) is a 2000 Indian Hindi-language romantic action drama film directed by Satish Kaushik, produced by Boney Kapoor, released on 24 August 2000. The film stars Anil Kapoor, Aishwarya Rai and Sonali Bendre in the lead roles. It is a remake of the Telugu film Pellichesukundam.

Plot
Preeti Vyas (Aishwarya Rai) is a young woman who bravely comes forward as a witness to a heinous assault carried by Bhavani Choudhry (Mukesh Rishi) and his men on a poor teacher whose land they wanted. The injured man is helped to the hospital by Preeti and a courteous and brave man called Avinash (Anil Kapoor), who holds strong morals and values.

Preeti's testimony angers the Choudhry family and, as a result, Choudhry's younger brother, Babloo Choudhry (Puru Raaj Kumar), rapes her. Subsequently, she is disowned by her family and ostracised by society.

She finds shelter with Avinash, who welcomes her to his home. Avinash lives alone with two young children. He later tells Preeti that the children are the result of a clandestine affair his father had with his secretary. The latter contacted Avinash on her deathbed to beg him to take care of the children. His father flat out refuses to acknowledge the children. Avinash takes them in and moves out of his parents' house. Preeti works at Avinash's office and helps him take care of the children at home. The two live well together as friends but this union invites a social opprobrium and strong uproar, and there is no other solution but marriage. They soon fall in love, and Avinash decides to ask Preeti for her hand in marriage. She refuses as she sees that as another favor and kind act, and Avinash respects her decision. Both of them attend a wedding where Preeti sees that her friend is marrying Babloo, the man who had raped her so Avinash beats him up and the police arrest Babloo and take him away.

After a year, Avinash's childhood friend Khushi (Sonali Bendre) returns from America. She tries to win his heart, as she is in love with him. This arouses jealousy in Preeti, and she realizes the depth of her love for Avinash. Avinash's parents never approved of his living arrangement with Preeti and want him to marry Khushi. Avinash's mother eventually approaches Preeti and insists that she will drop dead with shame if her son marries a rape victim. She begs Preeti to send Avinash to Khushi. Instead of being outraged at this insulting request, Preeti sheds a few tears and agrees. Avinash moves back to his parents' house and agrees to marry Khushi. But Preeti's friend tells Khushi about what Avinash's mother did. Khushi calls off the wedding and tells Avinash the truth. In the end, Preeti and Avinash are reunited.

Cast
 Anil Kapoor as Avinash
 Aishwarya Rai as Preeti Vyas
 Sonali Bendre as Khushi Malhotra 
 Puru Raaj Kumar as Babloo Chaudhry (Bhavani's brother)
 Mukesh Rishi as Bhavani Chaudhry
 Anang Desai as Avinash's father
 Anupam Kher as Muthu Pillai 
 Johnny Lever as Chatterjee
 Jaspal Bhatti as Balwinder (Balu)
 Himani Shivpuri as Sita Pillai
 Isha Talwar as Preeti's youngest sister
 Tannaz Irani as Babli, Preeti's friend
 Smita Jaykar as Avinash's mother

Awards
Won
 Star Screen Award Best Supporting Actress - Sonali Bendre
Nominated
 Star Screen Award Best Actress - Aishwarya Rai
 Filmfare Best Actress Award - Aishwarya Rai
 Zee Cine Award for best actress - Aishwarya Rai

Soundtrack 

The soundtrack of the film contains eight songs. The music is conducted by the duo Sanjeev–Darshan and the songs are written by Javed Akhtar. The song Gham Hai Kyon is a remake of the song Kadhala Kadhala with a slight change in instrumentation from the Tamil movie Avvai Shanmughi.

References

External links
 

2000 films
2000 romantic drama films
2000s Hindi-language films
Hindi remakes of Telugu films
Indian romantic drama films
Films directed by Satish Kaushik